Bunyan may refer to:

People
Jason Bunyan (born 1979), British speedway rider
John Bunyan (1628–1688), English Baptist preacher and author of The Pilgrim's Progress
John Bunyan Slaughter (1848–1928), American rancher and banker
Maureen Bunyan (born 1946), American journalist
Bunyan Joseph (1894-1986), Indian Bishop
Vashti Bunyan (born 1945), English musician
Jay Ryan (actor) (born 1981), New Zealand actor
Bunyan Edmund Vijayam (1933-2019), Indian Geologist

Places
Bunyan, New South Wales, Australia
Bunyan, Wisconsin, United States
Bünyan, Central Anatolia, Turkey

Arts and culture
Paul Bunyan, mythical lumberjack in American folklore
Paul Bunyan (operetta), by Benjamin Britten featuring the mythical lumberjack

See also
 Bunion, a foot deformity